The 2018 BYU Cougars football team represented Brigham Young University in the 2018 NCAA Division I FBS football season. The Cougars were led by third-year head coach Kalani Sitake, and played their home games at LaVell Edwards Stadium. This was the seventh year BYU competed as an NCAA Division I FBS independent. They finished the season 7–6. They were invited to the Famous Idaho Potato Bowl where they defeated Western Michigan.

Before the season

Coaching changes
On December 14, 2017, LSU offensive line coach Jeff Grimes was appointed the offensive coordinator replacing Ty Detmer who was relieved as offensive coordinator following the final game of the 2017 season. On December 27, 2017 it was announced that Aaron Roderick, Ryan Pugh, and Fesi Sitake would join the staff as offensive coaches. It was also announced that Steve Clark would remain on staff. On January 19, 2018 Preston Hadley was named to the defensive staff replacing Steve Kaufusi. On February 6, 2018 AJ Seward was named to the offensive staff. Finally Alema Fitisemanu replaced Tevita Ofahengaue as the recruiting coordinator.

2018 recruits

2017 returned missionaries

2018 other additions

2018 departures

Award watch lists
Listed in the order that they were released

Schedule

Media

Football Media Day
Football Media Day was held at the BYUtv studios on June 22, 2018 and was once again simulcast on BYUtv and ESPN3. TV news was shared as Athletic Director Tom Holmoe announced BYU would formally begin new contract negotiations with ESPN in the fall. Coach Sitake dodged questions about a potential quarterback controversy by saying their main goal was to play the best player possible in each position, and that would be determined in close door practices. The new coaching staff was also interviewed by Dave McCann. Additionally BYU held YouTube and radio player interviews throughout the day and did a feature show on BYU players who are currently in the NFL.

Nu Skin BYU Sports Network
The 2018 BYU Sports Network will appear slightly different from previous years. Greg Wrubell and Marc Lyons return as play-by-play and analyst, and Jason Shepherd returns as the host. However sideline reporter Nate Meikle left after becoming a lawyer, author, and being hired at Notre Dame’s Mendoza College of Business to be a postdoctoral teaching and research fellow. Replacing Nate as the sideline reporter is Mitchell Juergens.

In August, it was announced this will be Marc Lyons final season calling BYU football, his 38th year with that responsibility.

Affiliates

BYU Radio- Flagship Station Nationwide (Dish Network 980, Sirius XM 143, TuneIn radio, and byuradio.org)
KSL 102.7 FM and 1160 AM- (Salt Lake City / Provo, Utah and ksl.com)
KSNA- Blackfoot / Idaho Falls / Pocatello / Rexburg, Idaho
KMXD- Monroe / Manti, Utah
KSVC- Richfield / Manti, Utah
KCLS- St. George, Utah

Roster

Depth chart

Rankings

Game summaries

Arizona

Sources:

Uniform combination: white helmet, white jersey, white pants w/ blue accents.

Cal

Sources:

Uniform combination: white helmet, white jersey, white pants w/ blue accents.

Wisconsin

Sources:

Uniform combination: white helmet, white jersey, blue pants w/ white accents.

McNeese

Sources:

Uniform combination: white helmet, navy blue jersey, white pants w/ blue accents.

Washington

Sources:

Uniform combination: white helmet, white jersey, navy blue pants w/ white accents.

Utah State

Sources:

Uniform combination: white helmet, royal blue jersey, white pants w/ royal blue accents.

Hawai'i

Sources:

Uniform combination: white helmet, navy blue jersey, white pants w/ blue accents.

Northern Illinois

Sources:

Uniform combination: white helmet, navy blue jersey, white pants w/ pink accents. (Breast cancer awareness game)

Boise State

Sources:

Uniform combination: white helmet, white jersey, blue pants w/ white accents.

UMass

Sources:

Uniform combination: white helmet, white jersey, blue pants w/ white accents.

New Mexico State

Sources:

Uniform combination: white helmet, royal blue jersey, white pants w/ royal blue accents.

Utah

Sources:

Uniform combination: white helmet, royal blue jersey, white pants w/ royal blue accents.

Western Michigan (Famous Idaho Potato Bowl)

Sources:

Uniform combination: white helmet, royal blue jersey, royal blue pants w/ white accents.

Players drafted into the NFL

References

BYU
BYU Cougars football seasons
Famous Idaho Potato Bowl champion seasons
BYU Cougars football